The Cathedral of the Sacred Heart of Jesus is a religious building belonging to the Roman Catholic Church and is located on  Fourth Street in central Harare, Zimbabwe.

History

It serves as the headquarters of the Metropolitan Archdiocese of Harare (Archidioecesis Hararensis). It follows the Roman or Latin rite and was dedicated as its name indicates to the Sacred Heart of Jesus as a Catholic devotion tradition referred to the heart of Jesus of Nazareth.

It all began when the Jesuits first arrived in Harare (Salisbury); a chapel for forty people was opened in the grounds of the Dominican Convent in 1893.  Fr Aloysius Leboeuf became parish priest, living in a room built onto the side of the chapel, and from here he designed a new and bigger church, the Church of the Sacred Heart, opened on the feast of the Annunciation in 1900.  This in turn eventually proved too small and on 28 June 1924 Mgr Brown laid the foundation stone of the present Cathedral of the Sacred Heart.  The Cathedral was opened the following year, on Sunday, 2 August 1925. Jesuits continued to serve the Cathedral until 31 December 2008, when it was handed over to the diocesan clergy.

Due to the varied composition of the congregation most Masses are held in both English and Shona, a local language and to a lesser extent additionally there are services in French and Portuguese.

Mass Times

Sunday
 07:00hrs - English Mass in the Cathedral

 08:00hrs - Shona Mass in the Cathedral
 08:00hrs - Missionary Childhood/Sunday School Mass in the Jubilee Hall

 09:30hrs - Youth Mass in the Jubilee Hall

 10:00hrs - English Mass in the Cathedral

 11:30hrs - Shona Mass in the Cathedral

 13:00hrs - French Mass in the Cathedral

 17:30hrs - English Mass in the Cathedral
Monday to Friday
 09:00hrs - English Mass
 13:00hrs - English Mass
 17:30hrs - Shona Mass

Saturdays and Public Holidays
 09:00hrs - English Mass

See also
Roman Catholicism in Zimbabwe
Sacred Heart Cathedral (disambiguation)

References

Roman Catholic cathedrals in Zimbabwe
Buildings and structures in Harare